Abdellah Benyoucef (born 10 April 1987) is an Algerian cyclist, who currently rides for Algerian amateur team .

Major results

2007
 1st Stage 7 Tour de la Pharmacie Centrale
2011
 2nd Challenge Ben Guerir, Challenge des phosphates
 3rd Road race, National Road Championships
 7th Road race, African Road Championships
2012
 Challenge des phosphates
1st Challenge Ben Guerir
10th Challenge Khouribga
2013
 1st Circuit of Asmara
 4th Road race, African Road Championships
2014
 6th Critérium International d'Alger
 7th Critérium International de Blida
2015
 6th Critérium International de Sétif
 8th Overall Tour de Constantine
 8th Critérium International de Blida
2016
 1st Overall Tour du Sénégal
1st Stage 2
 5th Overall Tour de Constantine
2017
 2nd  Team time trial, African Road Championships
 6th Overall Tour de Tunisie

References

External links

1987 births
Living people
Algerian male cyclists
21st-century Algerian people